Bid Khvab (also Romanized as Bīd Khvāb, Bīd-e Khvāb, and Bīd-i-Khwāb; also known as Bīd Khab and Bīd Khvāh) is a village in Saadatabad Rural District, Pariz District, Sirjan County, Kerman Province, Iran. At the 2006 census, its population was 34, in 11 families.

References 

Populated places in Sirjan County